Events in the year 1904 in Germany.

Incumbents

National level
 Kaiser – Wilhelm II
 Chancellor – Bernhard von Bülow

State level

Kingdoms
 King of Bavaria – Otto of Bavaria
 King of Prussia – Kaiser Wilhelm II
 King of Saxony – George of Saxony to 15 October then Frederick Augustus III of Saxony
 King of Württemberg – William II of Württemberg

Grand duchies
 Grand Duke of Baden – Frederick I
 Grand Duke of Hesse – Ernest Louis
 Grand Duke of Mecklenburg–Schwerin – Frederick Francis IV
 Grand Duke of Mecklenburg–Strelitz – Frederick William to 30 May, then Adolphus Frederick V
 Grand Duke of Oldenburg – Frederick Augustus II
 Grand Duke of Saxe–Weimar–Eisenach – William Ernest

Principalities
 Schaumburg–Lippe – George, Prince of Schaumburg–Lippe
 Schwarzburg–Rudolstadt – Günther Victor, Prince of Schwarzburg–Rudolstadt
 Schwarzburg–Sondershausen – Karl Günther, Prince of Schwarzburg–Sondershausen
 Principality of Lippe – Alexander, Prince of Lippe (with Ernest II, Count of Lippe–Biesterfeld to 26 September, and then Leopold, Count of Lippe–Biesterfeld, as regents)
 Reuss Elder Line – Heinrich XXIV, Prince Reuss of Greiz (with Heinrich XIV, Prince Reuss Younger Line as regent)
 Reuss Younger Line – Heinrich XIV, Prince Reuss Younger Line
 Waldeck and Pyrmont – Friedrich, Prince of Waldeck and Pyrmont

Duchies
 Duke of Anhalt – Frederick I, Duke of Anhalt to 24 January, then Frederick II, Duke of Anhalt
 Duke of Brunswick – Prince Albert of Prussia (regent)
 Duke of Saxe–Altenburg – Ernst I, Duke of Saxe–Altenburg
 Duke of Saxe–Coburg and Gotha – Charles Edward, Duke of Saxe–Coburg and Gotha
 Duke of Saxe–Meiningen – Georg II, Duke of Saxe–Meiningen

Colonial governors
 Cameroon (Kamerun) – Jesko von Puttkamer (8th term) to 9 May, then Otto Gleim (acting governor) (1st term)
 Kiaochow (Kiautschou) – Oskar von Truppel
 German East Africa (Deutsch–Ostafrika) – Gustav Adolf von Götzen
 German New Guinea (Deutsch–Neuguinea) – Albert Hahl (2nd term)
 German Samoa (Deutsch–Samoa) – Wilhelm Solf
 German South–West Africa (Deutsch–Südwestafrika) – Theodor Leutwein
 Togoland – Waldemar Horn

Events
 12 January – The Herero of Deutsch–Südwestafrika, under the leadership of Samuel Maharero, rise against German colonial rule. The rising marks the beginning of what has become known as the Herero and Namaqua Genocide.
 3 March – Kaiser Wilhelm II becomes the first person to make a political recording of a document, using Thomas Edison's cylinder.
 April - The German Imperial Navy introduces SOS as a distress signal.
 11 August – The German Imperial Army, under Lothar von Trotha, defeat the Herero tribesmen at the Battle of Waterberg.

Architecture
 The Prussian House of Lords is rebuilt.
 The Kaiserbrücke in Mainz is completed.
 Publisher Pier Verlag established in Munich.

Arts
 January – Süddeutsche Monatshefte begins publication.
 Max Beckmann, Hans Purrmann, and Alexej von Jawlensky are added to the Berlin Secession group of artists.
 Leopold Graf von Kalckreuth paints a series of three portraits depicting socialite Marianne Lichtwark.

Commerce
 September – Stationery manufacturer Herlitz established in Berlin.
 Accumulatoren–Fabrik AFA establishes its battery making subsidiary VARTA in Hagen.

Diplomacy
 8 April – The Convention of Istanbul, signed by a number of powers including Germany in 1888, came into force.

Science
 Foundation of the German Journal for Evidence and Quality in Healthcare ZEFQ.

Sport

Association football
 16 April – FC Einigkeit Braunschweig established.
 4 May – FC Schalke 04 established.
 21 May – The International Federation of Association Football, FIFA, is established with Germany as a founder member.
 13 June – Westfalia Herne established.
 1 July – Bayer 04 Leverkusen established.
 4 July – Borussia Fulda established.
 25 July – Reinickendorfer FC West established.
 29 July – Alemannia Schwäbisch Gmünd established.
 4 August – FC Singen 04 established.
 Date unknown – Germania Breslau, Sport Club Reuß, Fußball–Club Prussia Königsberg, Oberhausener SV and 1. Würzburger FV 04 amongst the other clubs established.

Other
 1 July to 24 November – 1904 Summer Olympics take place in St. Louis, Missouri. Germany finishes second in the overall medal table with four gold medals, four silver and five bronze. The four gold medals all come in the swimming events, with two for Emil Rausch and one each for Walter Brack and Georg Zacharias.
 Date unknown – The inaugural Berlin City Chess Championship is won by Horatio Caro.

Transport
 The Berlin Mexikoplatz station is opened under the name Zehlendorf–Beerenstraße.

Ships launched
 SMS Deutschland (battleship)
 SMS Lothringen (battleship)
 SS Scharnhorst (passenger liner)
 SMS Yorck (armoured cruiser)

Publications

Drama
 Erich Mühsam – The Con Men
 Frank Wedekind – Die Büchse der Pandora

Non–fiction
 Ernst Haeckel – Kunstformen der Natur

Births

 2 January – Walter Heitler, physicist
 8 January – Karl Brandt, Nazi physician
 9 January – Wilhelm Groth, physical chemist
 29 January – Arnold Gehlen, German philosopher (died 1976)
 18 February – Otto Rahn, medievalist and SS officer (died 1939)
 22 February – Ernst Jakob Henne, racing driver (died 2005)
 28 February – Alfred Bohrmann, astronomer
 5 March – Karl Rahner, theologian
 7 March – Reinhard Heydrich, chief of the RSHA (died 1942)
 7 March – Kurt Weitzmann, art historian
 10 March – Adalbert Schneider, Navy officer
 11 March – Albrecht von Hagen, Resistance fighter
 12 March – Adolf Arndt, politician
 21 March – Karl Leonhard, psychiatrist
 24 March – Hans Ertel, natural scientist
 26 March – Hermann Schroeder, composer
 6 April – Kurt Georg Kiesinger, Chancellor of the Federal Republic of Germany (died 1988)
 12 April – Paul Dahlke, actor
 15 April – Valentin Krempl, bobsledder
 17 April – Franz Reuß, Luftwaffe general
 27 April – Fritz Weitzel, SS officer
 28 April – Elisabeth Schumacher, Resistance fighter
 4 May – Josef Pieper, philosopher
 8 May – Franz Schreiber, SS officer
 9 May – Reinhard Schwarz–Schilling, composer
 23 May – Johannes Flintrop, critic of Nazism
 7 June – Werner Gruner, German weapons designer (died 1995) 
 14 June – Marion Yorck von Wartenburg, jurist and Resistance fighter (died 2007)
 20 June – Heinrich von Brentano, politician (died 1964)
 9 July – Ernst Küppers, swimmer
 14 July – Hans von Herwarth, diplomat
 15 July – Rudolf Arnheim, film theorist
 2 August – Werner Seelenbinder, wrestler and communist
 9 August – Hasso von Boehmer, Army officer
 10 August – Karl Helling, chess master
 16 August – Klaus von Pape, Nazi 'martyr'
 24 August – Ludwig Schmidseder, composer and pianist
 29 August – Werner Forssmann, physician and Nobel Prize in Medicine laureate
 30 August – Friedrich von Mellenthin, Army general
 1 September – Karl Ernst, Sturmabteilung leader
 8 September – Karl Hessenberg, mathematician
 14 September – Walter Meyer, rower
 3 October – Ernst–Günther Schenck, SS officer
 21 October – Basilea Schlink, founder and leader of the Evangelical Sisterhood of Mary
 23 October – Maximilien de Furstenberg, Roman Catholic cardinal
 12 November – Edmund Veesenmayer, Nazi politician
 13 November – Günter Reimann, communist activist
 13 November – Peter Yorck von Wartenburg, jurist and Resistance fighter
 26 November – Bernhard Krüger, SS officer
 11 December – Felix Nussbaum, surrealist painter
 17 December – Josef–Franz Eckinger, Army officer
 30 December – Edith Schultze–Westrum, actress
 Date unknown – Heinz Kloss, linguist
 Date unknown – Wolfgang Stresemann, orchestra leader

Deaths 

 4 January – Friedrich Jolly, neurologist
 5 January – Karl Alfred von Zittel, palaeontologist
 6 January – Friedrich von Hefner-Alteneck, electrical engineer
 10 January – Christian August Friedrich Garcke, botanist
 20 January – Albert von Maybach, railway manager
 24 January – Frederick I, Duke of Anhalt, nobleman
 24 February – Ernst von Prittwitz und Gaffron, Prussian general
 5 March – Alfred von Waldersee, Field Marshal
 22 March – Karl Moritz Schumann, botanist
 1 April – Otto von Böhtlingk, Indologist
 6 May – Franz von Lenbach, painter
 21 May – Duke Paul Frederick of Mecklenburg, nobleman
 24 May – Duchess Maria Isabella of Württemberg, noblewoman
 30 May – Frederick William, Grand Duke of Mecklenburg–Strelitz, nobleman
 5 July – Franz Martin Hilgendorf, zoologist
 4 August – Christoph von Sigwart, philosopher
 5 August – Karl Weigert, pathologist
 9 August – Friedrich Ratzel, geographer
 26 August – Franz Riegel, internist
 3 September – Heinrich Koebner, dermatologist
 18 September – Herbert von Bismarck, politician
 26 September – Ernest II, Count of Lippe–Biesterfeld, nobleman, regent of the Principality of Lippe
 8 October – Clemens Winkler, chemist who discovered germanium
 15 October – George, King of Saxony
 29 October – Emil Schlagintweit, scholar of Tibetan Buddhism
 10 November – Alphons Stübel, geologist and vulcanologist
 19 November – Hans von Hopfen, writer
 2 December – Prince Frederick of Hohenzollern–Sigmaringen, nobleman
 20 December – Alexandrine of Baden (1820–1904), noblewoman
 25 December – Guido Bodländer, chemist
 Date unknown 
 Gustav Kessler, trade unionist
 Eduard von Martens, zoologist
 Carl August Wilhelm Schwacke, botanist

References

 
Years of the 20th century in Germany
Germany
Germany